Chaetolopha emporias is a moth of the family Geometridae. It is known from Australia, including Queensland and Tasmania.

The wingspan is about 20 mm. Adult have brown wings, with a pale spot in a dark mark near the apex, and broad light and dark bands across each forewing. The hindwings are uniform pale brown.

The larvae are thought to feed on various Polypodiophyta species.

References

Moths described in 1904
Larentiinae
Moths of Australia